Matthew 5 is the fifth chapter of the Gospel of Matthew in the New Testament. It contains the first portion of the Sermon on the Mount, the other portions of which are contained in chapters 6 and 7. Portions are similar to the Sermon on the Plain in Luke 6, but much of the material is found only in Matthew. It is one of the most discussed and analyzed chapters of the New Testament. Warren Kissinger reports that among early Christians, no chapter was more often cited by early scholars. The same is true in modern scholarship.

Text
The original text was written in Koine Greek. This chapter is divided into 48 verses.

Textual witnesses
Some early manuscripts containing text from this chapter are:
Papyrus 64 (Magdalen papyrus)
Papyrus 86 (4th century; extant verses 13–16, 22–25)
Codex Vaticanus (4th century)
Codex Sinaiticus (4th century)
Codex Washingtonianus (4-5th century)
Codex Bezae (5th century)
Codex Alexandrinus (5th century)
Codex Ephraemi Rescriptus (5th century; extant verses 1–14)

Structure 
The structure of Matthew 5 can be broken down as follows:
 – Setting and Beatitudes
 – Salt of the earth and light of the world
 – Law and the Prophets
 – Do not hate
 – Do not lust
 – Do not divorce except for sexual misconduct
 – Do not swear oaths 
 – Do not retaliate
 – Love your enemies

Old Testament references
 : Psalm

Analysis
In the Middle Ages an interpretation was developed that the chapter only applied to a select group, and not to the general populace. Reformer Martin Luther, in a discussion of this chapter, was highly critical of the Catholic view. He wrote that "there have fallen upon this [fifth] chapter the vulgar hogs and asses, jurists and sophists, the right hand of the pope and his Mamelukes."

In John Wesley's analysis of the Sermon on the Mount, chapter five outlines "the sum of all true religion", allowing chapter 6 to detail "rules for that right intention which we are to preserve in all our outward actions, unmixed with worldly desires or anxious cares for even the necessaries of life" and chapter 7 to provide "cautions against the main hinderances of religion".

Matthew 5 contains parallels to the other Synoptic Gospels. These include a few parallels to Mark (e.g., Mark 4, 5, 9) and many to Luke, especially to the Sermon on the Plain (Luke 6), as well as to other materials (e.g., Luke 8, 12, 14, 16). According to the four-source hypothesis, most of Matthew 5 is based on Q and Matthew's unique source or sources (M). Harvey King McArthur considers the parallels in Luke to be very loose, much further away than most areas they overlap. McArthur thus theorizes that there must have been an extra step between the sources Matthew and Luke used.

Beatitudes

After a brief introduction (Matthew 5:1–2), the chapter contains the section known as the Beatitudes, which includes some of Jesus' most famous teachings. Robert H. Gundry suggests that the Beatitudes can be divided into two quartets. The first group of four beatitudes describes the ideal righteous behaviour of Jesus' disciples. The second group of four focuses on the persecution that these disciples will likely encounter because of their righteous behaviour. 

Some scholars feel the ninth Beatitude in Matthew 5:11 is separate from the first eight, as demonstrated by its shift to the second person. However, the use of the second person here may simply be a reflection of the four beatitudes found in Luke 6:20-23 that are all in the second person. In contrast to Matthew's beatitudes with their characteristic spiritual expressions (e.g., "poor in spirit", "hunger and thirst for righteousness", and "persecuted for righteousness sake") and the multiple references to his own term, the "kingdom of heaven", Luke reflects social and economic realities with simple mentions of "you who are poor", "you who are hungry now", and "when people hate you". This understanding is clearly evident in Luke's four parallel "woes", which he inserted after the beatitudes in verses 24-26. Furthermore, Luke uses the common expression "kingdom of God", the only term for the kingdom used in Mark and Luke. All this suggests that the number and versions of the beatitudes found in Luke 6 are closer to the sayings of Jesus than those in Matthew, as well known and beloved as they may be.

The English word used to show the positive nature of the Beatitudes is blessed. A number of scholars note that this is not an ideal translation as in modern English, blessed often means "blessed by God", a meaning not implied by the Greek. William F. Albright and C. S. Mann use the more general word fortunate instead of blessed. R. T. France feels that it should be read as "worthy of congratulation". Lapide supports the New American Bible usage of happy; it directly translates the word beatus in the Vulgate, and it carries the meaning of the Greek. After the Beatitudes there are a series of metaphors, called Salt and Light, that are often seen as commentaries upon them. These include a number of famous phrases such as salt of the earth and city on a hill.

Teachings on the law

The role and importance of the law
 Verse 17 – Jesus states that he has not come to "abolish the law" but to "fulfill" it. 
 Verse 18 – Jesus then declares the law to be valid until "Heaven and Earth pass away" and "all things are accomplished". 
 Verse 19 – shows a direct correlation between the act of adhering to the Biblical Code, and the righteousness of the individual. 
 Verse 20 – Jesus identifies Greater Righteousness as a condition for inclusion in the Kingdom of Heaven.

The NIV translation entitles  "The Fulfillment of the Law", the NRSV translation entitles it "The Law and the Prophets", the United Bible Societies' "The Greek New Testament", edited by Kurt Aland, Bruce Metzger and others, entitles it the "Teaching about the Law".

This pericope is at the core of the argument about the relationship between the views attributed to Jesus, such as Gospel, Grace, New Covenant, New Commandment, Law of Christ, and those attributed to Moses or the Mosaic Law, and hence on the relationship between the New Testament and Old Testament, Christian views on the old covenant, Law and Gospel, and as a basis of Christian ethics.

The reason for this argument is a disagreement about the proper interpretation of the word "fulfillment" (πληρῶσαι; plerosai). This goes back at least as far as Marcion of Sinope and continues until today. Many modern scholars now consider these four verses to be a prelude to the Antitheses, but this position is not universally accepted, and many continue to interpret Matthew 5:17–20 independent of its textual neighbors.

Antitheses

The sermon then moves to a highly structured discussion ("Ye have heard...  But I say unto you") of the "Law and Prophets" or Old Covenant. This section (Matthew 5:17 to Matthew 5:48) is traditionally referred to as the Antitheses, or the Six Antitheses.

Gundry disputes this title: "The sayings are traditionally called 'the Antitheses'. Instead Gundry argues that Jesus escalates the Law towards "the goal toward which it was already headed, so that we should stop calling these sayings "the Antitheses" and perhaps start calling them "the Culminations".

After the introduction (5:17–20), the next verses are commentaries on six specific topics where Jesus recites a law, starting with two of the Ten Commandments, and then comments on it. This generally sees Jesus impose more rigorous standards. The six antitheses are on: 
You shall not murder in verses 21, 22, 23, 24, 25, 26
You shall not commit adultery in verses 27, 28, 29, 30
Divorce in verses 31 and 32
Oaths in verses 33, 34, 35, 36, 37
Eye for an eye in verses 38, 39, 40, 41, 42
Love thy neighbour as thyself in verses 43, 44, 45, 46, 47, 48

The Jewish Encyclopedia states:

Jesus' six antitheses are on six topics. In each of them, Jesus opens the statement with words to the effect: "You have heard it said... but I say to you...". These antitheses appear only in Matthew. At the outset, Jesus made it clear that he greatly respects Old Testament Law in the Torah, and fulfilling the Law was one of his purposes for coming to Earth.

Daniel J. Harrington believes that the community for which Matthew wrote primarily but not exclusively were Jewish Christians. If so, that may explain why Matthew could use Jewish rhetoric and themes without explanation. Harrington says that is not the case for 21st-century Americans and others who read the Gospel today. In the six antitheses Jesus either extends through the Commandment's scope by going to the root of the abuse (avoiding anger and lust to prevent murder and adultery) or going beyond a biblical commandment as in the case of divorce and oaths. Harrington writes that Matthew presents the six antitheses as examples of the principle that Jesus came not to abolish but to fulfill the Law and the Prophets.

Murder 
The first antithesis (verses 21–22) attacks anger as the root of murder. The two loosely connected illustrations (23–24, 25–26) point out the value of reconciling with one's enemy.

Adultery 
The second antithesis (verses 27–28), clearly addressed to men, attacks lust as the root of adultery. The sayings about the right eye and the right-hand as causes of scandal (29–30) are further instances of going to the sources of sin.

Divorce 
The third antithesis (verses 31–32), also addressed to men, not only contains Jesus' rejection of the legal process of divorce stated in  but uniquely includes his only justification for divorce, i.e. "sexual unfaithfulness" (cf. Matthew 19:8).

Oaths 

The fourth antithesis (verses 33–37) about oaths says to avoid oaths entirely so as never to swear falsely.

An eye for an eye 
The fifth antithesis on non-retaliation (verses 38–39a) also urges the followers of Jesus to not seek revenge through violence. The examples not only prohibit violence, but also require that brutality and force be met with goodness.

Love for enemies 
The final antithesis (verses 43–48) expands the concept of "neighbor". Here Jesus urges that love include even enemies instead of restricting love only to those who either can benefit us or who already love us. This section concludes with the call to be perfect, "as your heavenly Father is perfect", i.e. be like God, who "causes his sun to rise on the evil and the good, and send rain on the righteous and the unrighteous" - on his friends and his enemies (verse 45). This is not an exhortation to a kind of abstract perfection or the concluding summary of the whole chapter but simply the ending of a call to specific action, "love your enemies." God models this. Be like God.

Verses

See also
Turning the other cheek

Notes

References

Sources
Albright, W.F. and C.S. Mann. "Matthew". The Anchor Bible Series. New York: Doubleday & Co., 1971.
Betz, Hans Dieter. Essays on the Sermon on the Mount. Translations by Laurence Welborn. Philadelphia: Fortress Press, 1985.
Clarke, Howard W. The Gospel of Matthew and its Readers: A Historical Introduction to the First Gospel. Bloomington: Indiana University Press, 2003.
France, R.T. The Gospel According to Matthew: an Introduction and Commentary. Leicester: Inter-Varsity, 1985.
Gundry, Robert H. Matthew a Commentary on his Literary and Theological Art. Grand Rapids: William B. Eerdmans, 1982.
Hill, David. The Gospel of Matthew. Grand Rapids: Eerdmans, 1981.
Kissinger, Warren S. The Sermon on the Mount: A History of Interpretation and Bibliography. Metuchen: Scarecrow Press, 1975.

 Lapide, Pinchas. The Sermon on the Mount, Utopia or Program for Action? translated from the German by Arlene Swidler. Maryknoll: Orbis Books, 1986.
McArthur, Harvey King. Understanding the Sermon on the Mount. Westport: Greenwood Press, 1978.
Schweizer, Eduard. The Good News According to Matthew. Atlanta: John Knox Press, 1975.

External links

 King James Bible - Wikisource
English Translation with Parallel Latin Vulgate
Online Bible at GospelHall.org (ESV, KJV, Darby, American Standard Version, Bible in Basic English)
Multiple bible versions at Bible Gateway (NKJV, NIV, NRSV etc.)

 
Matthew 05